Gilbertia may refer to:
Gilbertia (mollusc), a genus of molluscs
Gilbertiola, a genus of weevils originally described as Gilbertia
Hypoplectrodes, a genus of serranid fish
Walsinghamiella, a genus of moths originally described as Gilbertia